KELM-LP, UHF analog channel 43, was a low-powered Mexicanal-affiliated television station licensed to Reno, Nevada, United States.

KELM-LP, the Mexicanal affiliate and its sister station, KRRI-LP, the Azteca America affiliate, both broadcast in Spanish, are housed in a  glass-walled facility at the Meadowood Mall in south Reno.

History
On or around October 2008, the bankruptcy court sold KELM-LP to Ngensolutions LLC. Ngensolutions entered into negotiations with Mexicanal for an affiliation agreement for the Reno DMA. KELM-LP commenced broadcasting as a Mexicanal affiliate during September 2010 and started local production and insertion during October 2010 from its facilities at Meadowood Mall. Krypton enterprises took over afterwards.

The station went off the air in June 2014. The FCC cancelled its license on June 17, 2015.

References

Defunct television stations in the United States
Television channels and stations established in 1990
Television channels and stations disestablished in 2015
ELM-LP
1990 establishments in Nevada